Mohd Shahar bin Abdullah (Jawi: محمد شاهر بن عبدﷲ; born 6 December 1980) is a Malaysian politician who has served as the Member of Parliament (MP) for Paya Besar since May 2018. He served as the Deputy Minister of Finance I in the Barisan Nasional (BN) administration under fomer Prime Minister Ismail Sabri Yaakob and former Minister Tengku Zafrul Aziz from August 2021 to the collapse of the BN administration in November 2022 and the Deputy Minister of Finance II in the Perikatan Nasional (PN) administration under former Prime Minister Muhyiddin Yassin and former Minister Tengku Zafrul from March 2020 to the collapse of BN administration in August 2021. He is a member of the United Malays National Organisation (UMNO), a component party of the BN coalition.

Political career

Shahar contested seat in Paya Besar in 2018 Malaysian general election, defeating candidates from Pakatan Harapan (PH) and Malaysian Islamic Party (PAS).

Shahar was also appointed the Youth Information Chief of UMNO after being elected in 2018.

On 9 March 2020, he was appointed Deputy Minister of Finance II to Muhyiddin cabinet of the PN administration. He also held the position with Abdul Rahim Bakri.

In 2018, he contested for UMNO Youth Chief but lost to Dato Dr Asyraf Wajdi Dusuki. In July 2018, he was appointed as UMNO Youth Communication Chief by Asyraf Wajdi.

Election results

Honours

Honours of Malaysia
  :
  Grand Knight of the Order of the Crown of Pahang (SIMP) – Dato' Indera  (2021)

References 

1980 births
Living people
People from Pahang
Malaysian people of Malay descent
Malaysian Muslims
United Malays National Organisation politicians
Members of the Dewan Rakyat